List of Girls' Singles Junior Grand Slam tournaments tennis champions.

Many of these junior champions went on to become major champions and world No. 1s on the senior tour including Evonne Goolagong Cawley (world No. 1 and 8-time major winner), Sue Barker (1976 French Open champion), Mima Jaušovec (1977 French Open champion), Chris O'Neil (1978 Australian Open champion), Tracy Austin (world No. 1 and two-time US Open champion), Hana Mandlikova (4-time major champion), Gabriela Sabatini (1990 US Open champion), Jennifer Capriati (world No. 1 and 3-time major champion), Lindsay Davenport (world No. 1 and 3-time major champion), Martina Hingis (world No. 1 and 5-time major winner), Amélie Mauresmo (world No. 1 and two-time major champion), Justine Henin (world No. 1 and won seven majors), Jelena Jankovic (world No. 1), Marion Bartoli (2013 Wimbledon champion), Victoria Azarenka (world No. 1 and two-time Australian Open champion), Jeļena Ostapenko (2017 French Open champion), Caroline Wozniacki (world No. 1 and 2018 Australian Open champion), Simona Halep (world No. 1 and 2-time major champion), Ashleigh Barty (world No. 1 and 3-time major champion), and Iga Świątek (world No. 1 and three-time major champion). 

Other notable names who were successful on the tour were Zina Garrison (world No. 4 and 1990 Wimbledon finalist), Natasha Zvereva (1988 French Open finalist and world No. 1 in doubles), Magdalena Maleeva (world No. 4), Cara Black (world No. 1 and 10-time major champion in doubles and mixed doubles), Nadia Petrova (world No. 3 and two-time major semifinalist), Agnieszka Radwańska (world No. 2 and 2012 Wimbledon finalist), Karolína Plíšková (world No. 1 and two-time major finalist), Eugenie Bouchard (world No. 5 and 2014 Wimbledon finalist), Elina Svitolina (world No. 3), Ons Jabeur (world No. 2 and two-time major finalist), Coco Gauff (world No. 8, world No. 1 in doubles, 2022 French Open finalist), Anastasia Pavlyuchenkova (world No. 11 and 2021 French Open finalist), Paula Badosa (world No. 2), Daria Kasatkina (world No. 9 and 2022 French Open semifinalist), Maria Kirilenko (world No. 10 and Olympic medallist), and Kristina Mladenovic (world No. 10, doubles world No. 1, nine-time major doubles champion).

Champions by year

Most Grand Slam singles titles

Note: when a tie, the person to reach the mark first is listed first.

Grand Slam singles titles by country (since 1974)

Multiple titles in a season

Three titles in a single season

Surface Slam 
Players who won Grand Slam titles on clay, grass and hard courts in a calendar year.

Channel Slam 
Players who won the French Open-Wimbledon double.

See also
List of Grand Slam boys' singles champions
List of Grand Slam boys' doubles champions
List of Grand Slam girls' doubles champions

girls
 
Girls